Xanthocampsomeris is a New World genus of the family Scoliidae, also known as the scoliid wasps.

Species 
Species within this genus include:

Xanthocampsomeris completa (Rohwer, 1927)
Xanthocampsomeris fulvohirta (Cresson, 1865)
Xanthocampsomeris hesterae (Rohwer, 1927)
Xanthocampsomeris limosa (Burmeister, 1853)

References 

Parasitic wasps
Scoliidae
Hymenoptera genera